Benjamin Hardin (February 29, 1784 – September 24, 1852) was a United States representative from Kentucky. Martin Davis Hardin was his cousin.

Biography
Hardin was born at the Georges Creek settlement on the Monongahela River, Westmoreland County, Pennsylvania and then moved with his parents to Washington County, Kentucky in 1788. He attended the schools of Nelson and Washington Counties, Kentucky before studying law. Admitted to the bar in 1806, he commenced practice in Elizabethtown and Bardstown, Nelson County, Kentucky, and then settled in Bardstown, Kentucky in 1808. He owned slaves.

Hardin was a member of the Kentucky House of Representatives in 1810, 1811, 1824, and 1825 and served in the Kentucky Senate 1828–1832. He was elected as a Republican to the Fourteenth Congress (March 4, 1815 – March 3, 1817) and reelected as a Republican to the Sixteenth and Seventeenth Congresses (March 4, 1819 – March 3, 1823). He was elected as an Anti-Jacksonian to the Twenty-third and Twenty-fourth Congresses (March 4, 1833 – March 3, 1837).

After leaving Congress, Hardin served as the Secretary of State of Kentucky 1844–1847. He served as a member of the Kentucky constitutional convention in 1849.

Death and interment
Hardin died in Bardstown, Kentucky in 1852 and was buried in the family burying ground near Springfield, Kentucky.

References

1784 births
1852 deaths
People from Westmoreland County, Pennsylvania
Hardin family of Kentucky
American people of French descent
Democratic-Republican Party members of the United States House of Representatives from Kentucky
National Republican Party members of the United States House of Representatives from Kentucky
Secretaries of State of Kentucky
Members of the Kentucky House of Representatives
Kentucky lawyers
American slave owners